Conewago Creek is an  tributary of the Susquehanna River in Adams and York counties in Pennsylvania in the United States, with its watershed also draining a small portion of Carroll County, Maryland.

Name
The name of the creek comes from the Lenape, meaning "at the rapids", although the rapids are not on Conewago Creek.

Course
Conewago Creek flows east , then northeast  to its mouth. The source is in Franklin Township in Adams County, and the mouth is at the Susquehanna River at York Haven in York County.

Watershed

Tributaries
Opossum Creek
South Branch Conewago Creek
Bermudian Creek
Beaver Creek
Bennett Run
Little Conewago Creek (west)

Recreation
Canoeing: Edward Gertler writes that Conewago Creek is "a dull creek.. if you have seen one mile of Conewago, you have seen it all".

Fishing: A small section of Conewago Creek in western Adams County has been designated as approved trout waters by the Pennsylvania Fish and Boat Commission. This means the waters will be stocked with trout and may be fished during trout season. Further downstream in Adams County there is a small "catch and release" section of the creek.

The creek is home to a variety of fish including smallmouth bass, walleye, bluegill, rock bass, sunfish, carp, channel catfish, flathead catfish, yellow perch, rainbow trout, muskellunge and crappie.

Bridges and dams
There are many crossings and dams, some of which are named:

Ganoga Bridge
East Berlin Dam
Browns Dam
Dicks Dam
Detters Mill Dam
Sharrer Mill Dam
Kuhn's Fording Bridge - removed
Harlacher Bridge
Sheeps Bridge
Iron Bridge near Biglerville

See also
List of rivers of Pennsylvania

References

Rivers of Carroll County, Maryland
Rivers of Pennsylvania
Tributaries of the Susquehanna River
Rivers of York County, Pennsylvania
Rivers of Adams County, Pennsylvania